Tomczak is a Polish surname. Notable people with the surname include:

Bartłomiej Tomczak (born 1985), Polish handball player
Beatrice Tomczak (born 1995), Polish-German ice dancer
Jacek Tomczak (born 1973), Polish politician
Jacek Tomczak (born 1990), Polish chess grandmaster
Kazimierz Tomczak (1883–1967), 20th-century Polish bishop theologian and teacher
Larry Tomczak, American pastor
Mike Tomczak (born 1962), American football player
Witold Tomczak (born 1957), Polish politician

See also
Nicole Tomczak-Jaegermann (1945–2022), Polish-Canadian mathematician

Polish-language surnames